Zakir Husain  IP, JP, PSP, IGP, (2 November 1897 – 24 May 1971) was a politician who served as the Governor of East Pakistan and Interior Minister of Pakistan, both in the General Ayub Khan military regime.

Early life
Zakir Husain was born on 2 November 1897 in Ghatchek, Rangunia, Chittagong. After his primary schooling in Rangunia, Chittagong, he was a student of Collegiate School, Chittagong. He graduated from Aligarh Muslim University.

Career
He was the first Indian Muslim to qualify for the Imperial Police Service of India in 1920.  During his career in the police service, he served at various places in the erstwhile East Bengal.  After the Second World War, at the time of partition of India in 1947, he was the Deputy Inspector General of Police of Presidency Range, Calcutta and ex-officio Shipping Master, Calcutta Port.  He like many other Muslims opted for Pakistan, and was appointed the first Inspector General of Police of East Pakistan in August 1947.  In 1952 he became the chairman of Federal Public Service Commission.

Later career 
During the language movement in 1952 he was the Inspector General of Police, East Pakistan. After his retirement from Police Service in 1952, he was appointed the Chairman, Federal Public Service Commission of Pakistan for five years.  It was during his chairmanship that the proportional representation in the different services (CSP, PSP, PFS etc.) of the provinces of Pakistan was adopted.  In 1958 he became the Governor of East Pakistan, and in 1961 appointed the central minister for Home & Kashmir Affairs of Pakistan.  He returned to Chittagong in 1964, and retired from active politics.

He initiated many important institutions during his working life.  His first was the establishment of Faujdarhat Cadet College, and Colonel Gibson, who retired as Director General of the East Pakistan Rifles, was appointed the first principal. Among others, he initiated the building of the 500-bed Chittagong Medical College Hospital, Chittagong University, Chittagong Women's College, Chittagong New Market, and the establishment of Rangunia College from a school. He also established Begum Iqbal Zakir Husain School, a Women's College in Rangunia now. Two major city roads have been named after him, Zakir Husain Road in Chittagong and in Dhaka.

Personal life
Late Zakir Husain was married to Feroza, daughter of Khan Bahadur Aman Ali of Bakalia (Laldigi East).  He had three sons, Zahid, Adil and Shahid Husain and three daughters, Zehra[fateha], Zeenat and Farida.

Death
During the liberation struggle, on 9 April 1971 the Pakistan army attacked his home on a hilltop in Chittagong, killing most of his guards and servants.  He and his eldest son Zahid Husain who was at that time with him, were lined up to be shot and were pushed down the hill when the commanding officer arrived and stopped them.  The first floor of the house was destroyed by mortar attack, so he was taken in as the guest of Mr. M.M. Ispahani for a few days.  He returned to his house after a while after some Bihari settlers who had in the meantime occupied it, were evicted. He died on 24 May 1971. Curfew was lifted for a few hours so that his funeral could take place at the Laldighi Maidan in Chittagong. He was buried next to his second wife's grave, adjacent to Graribullah Shah's Mazaar & Mosque in Chittagong.

References

1897 births
1971 deaths
Interior ministers of Pakistan
Governors of East Pakistan
People of East Pakistan
Pakistani MNAs 1962–1965